Emanuel Perrone (born 14 June 1983) is an Argentine former professional footballer who played as a striker.

Career
Perrone started his career at Talleres in the Primera Division Argentina in 2002.
In 2004, he moved to France to join Troyes he was at the club for one season before moving to Ionikos in Greece.

In 2006, he moved to Apollon Kalamarias where he joined former Talleres teammate Lucas Favalli.
Later on he got transferred to Anorthosis Famagusta FC and had his debut on 6 February 2011 on a league match against Enosis Neon Paralimniou.

On 3 August 2011 Perrone signed for Asteras. While he played at Asteras, the team had done the best in their team's history, reaching 3rd place in Greece's most professional league of soccer/football. At the beginning of 2013/14 season he signed a one-year contract with Kalloni.

On 16 July 2014 Emanuel Perrone signed a two-year contract with Iraklis. He scored in his debut for the club, a cup match against Lamia. By scoring against Kalloni in 2015–16 season's opener, he became the first foreign player to score with six different teams in Greece's top tier league.
On 16 October 2017, by scoring with the jersey of AEL against Panathinaikos, Perrone became the first foreign footballer who scores with seven different teams in Greece, increasing his record since last year. He has also a second nationality, holding Italian passport.

On 7 August 2018, Iraklis officially announced the return of the experienced Argentine striker. On 19 December 2019, Perrone retired from football after starting the current campaign with Iraklis in the lower leagues of Greek football.

Career statistics

Club

References

External links

Emanuel Perrone – Argentine Primera statistics at Fútbol XXI 

1983 births
Living people
Argentine footballers
Argentine expatriate footballers
Association football forwards
Talleres de Córdoba footballers
ES Troyes AC players
Atromitos F.C. players
Apollon Pontou FC players
Anorthosis Famagusta F.C. players
Asteras Tripolis F.C. players
Iraklis Thessaloniki F.C. players
Argentine Primera División players
Ligue 2 players
Super League Greece players
Cypriot First Division players
People from Río Cuarto, Córdoba
Expatriate footballers in Greece
Expatriate footballers in Cyprus
Pan American Games medalists in football
Pan American Games gold medalists for Argentina
Footballers at the 2003 Pan American Games
Medalists at the 2003 Pan American Games
Sportspeople from Córdoba Province, Argentina